The Macquarie Law Journal is an annual peer-reviewed law review published by the Macquarie Law School at Macquarie University. It is published online and in hard copy.

External links 
 

Australian law journals
Annual journals
Publications established in 2001
English-language journals